Crassula closiana is a herb in the family Crassulaceae that is native to Western Australia.

It produces white-cream flowers in the spring time between September and October.

The plant is commonly found on granite slopes, sand dunes and in winter wet areas in the South West, Great Southern, Peel and Wheatbelt regions.

References

closiana
Plants described in 1898
Flora of Western Australia